Nidimys occultus is a multituberculate which existed in the United States during the Edmontonian faunal stage of the upper Cretaceous period, and the only species in the genus Nidimys.

References

Ptilodontoids
Cretaceous mammals
Fossil taxa described in 2010
Fossils of the United States
Prehistoric mammal genera